Harald Walter Bernhard Schubring (9 September 1942 – 20 November 2021), stage name Ted Herold, was a German rock and roll singer.

Life
He was born in Berlin-Schöneberg, Brandenburg, Prussia, Germany. Besides an extensive discography, Herold also acted in several films in the 1960s.

Herold died on 20 November 2021, along with his wife in a house fire in Dortmund, aged 79.

References

External links
 
 

1942 births
2021 deaths
German male singers
Singers from Berlin
Deaths from fire